Vada or Vayda may refer to:

People
Gunnar Vada (born 1927), Norwegian politician
Vada Nobles, American record producer
Vada Pinson (1938–1995), American baseball player
Vada Sultenfuss, fictional character in the 1991 film My Girl
Valentín Vada (born 1996), Argentinian footballer

Places
Caput Vada, Tunisia
Vada Agaram, Chennai, India
Vada, Palghar, India
Vada, Georgia, a community in the United States
Vada, Missouri, a community in the United States
Vada, Rosignano Marittimo, a town in Tuscany, Italy

Other uses
Vada (food), a fritter-type snack from south India
Vada Chennai, an Indian film
Ulmus 'Wanoux', an elm cultivar marketed under the selling name Vada